Jessica Hess (born 1981) is an American contemporary artist, based in Oakland, California. She is internationally known for her realist paintings, which often feature either a landscape, buildings in a state of decay, street art, and/or graffiti. Her paintings are of urban environment and fame and confirm the art of graffiti through fine lenses of oil paintings on canvas and gouache on paper.

Hess was born in Massachusetts and she grew up in North Carolina. Hess attended Rhode Island School of Design (RISD) in Providence, Rhode Island and graduated with a BFA degree in Illustration in 2003. Her work was featured in the juried international art magazine, New American Paintings, issue number 74 (February/March 2008). Hess' artwork was used as an illustration for Harper's Magazine (April 2009).

Exhibitions 
This is a list of select exhibitions by Hess, in order by year.

 2019 – District 13 Art Fair, Paris, France
 2019 – The Chaos Aesthetic, solo exhibition, Hashimoto Contemporary, San Francisco, California
 2012 – Boston Ten and Beyond, the Danforth Museum, Framingham, Massachusetts

Publications 

 Juxtapoz Hyperreal, Gingko Press, 2014

References

1981 births
Artists from Oakland, California
Rhode Island School of Design alumni
Realist artists
Painters from North Carolina
American illustrators
Living people